Josef Robertson (born 14 May 1987) is a Jamaican hurdler. At the 2012 Summer Olympics, he competed in the Men's 400 metres hurdles. He competed at the 2010 Commonwealth Games and the World Championships in Athletics in 2009 and 2011.

References 
 

Living people
1987 births
Jamaican male hurdlers
Olympic athletes of Jamaica
Athletes (track and field) at the 2012 Summer Olympics
Commonwealth Games competitors for Jamaica
Athletes (track and field) at the 2010 Commonwealth Games
World Athletics Championships athletes for Jamaica